General elections were held in the Ottoman Empire in 1920 in order to select delegates to the new Grand National Assembly. The elections were dominated by the Association for the Defense of the Rights of Anatolia and Rumelia, which consisted of nationalist local groups protesting against the Allied occupation of Turkey.

Background
Following the 1919 general elections, the newly elected Parliament convened in Istanbul on 12 January 1920. However, its approval of the Misak-ı Millî (National Pact) led to Allied forces occupying the city on 16 March. Several MPs were arrested and deported. Sultan Mehmed VI dissolved Parliament on 11 April.

After Istanbul had been occupied, the leader of the Turkish National Movement Mustafa Kemal sent telegrams out to Provincial Authorities and army commanders on 19 March ordering them to hold elections for a Grand National Assembly.

Aftermath
Following the elections, the new Grand National Assembly met in Ankara on 23 April 1920, with Mustafa Kemal as its chairman.

References

Turkey
Turkey
Elections in the Ottoman Empire
1920 in the Ottoman Empire
Elections in Turkey